Jacinto Regino Pachano (born 1835–1903) was a Venezuelan military person, writer and politician.

See also
List of Ministers of Foreign Affairs of Venezuela
List of Venezuelans

External links

 

 

1835 births
1903 deaths
Venezuelan military personnel
Members of the Senate of Venezuela
Venezuelan male writers
People from Falcón
Venezuelan Ministers of Interior
Members of the Venezuelan Chamber of Deputies
Venezuelan Ministers of Foreign Affairs
Planning ministers of Venezuela
Trade ministers of Venezuela